"Shooting Star" is a song by British happy hardcore band Bang!, written by Nick Arnold. It was released as a 12-inch vinyl single in the United Kingdom in January 1998. The song later experienced success when covered by English electronic music duo Flip & Fill in 2002.

Flip & Fill version

"Shooting Star" was covered by Flip & Fill and released as their second single on 15 July 2002. Produced by Flip & Fill, the track's lead vocals are performed by Karen Parry. Upon its release, the song became Flip & Fill's highest-charting single in the United Kingdom, peaking at number three on the UK Singles Chart. It also reached number 34 in Ireland, where it is their longest-charting single. "Shooting Star" was later included on Flip & Fill's only studio album, Floorfillas, in 2003.

Release and reception
In the United Kingdom, record label All Around the World released "Shooting Star" on 15 July 2002 across three formats: two CD singles and a 12-inch vinyl single. Six days after its release, on 21 July, the song debuted and peaked at number three on the UK Singles Chart, becoming Flip & Fill's highest-charting single in their home country and their second top-10 hit there, after "True Love Never Dies" earlier that year. The song spent 11 weeks in the UK top 100: 10 weeks in 2002 and one week in 2005, when it re-appeared at number 87 that January. In 2019, the British Phonographic Industry (BPI) certified the song silver for sales and streams of over 200,000 units.

"Shooting Star" also charted in Ireland. On 18 July 2002, the track debuted at number 36 on the Irish Singles Chart, the same position "True Love Never Dies" had peaked at six months earlier. On the Eurochart Hot 100, the single debuted and peaked at number 15 based on its combined British and Irish sales. It spent four weeks on this chart throughout August 2002.

Track listings
UK CD1
 "Shooting Star" (Flip & Fill radio edit)
 "Shooting Star" (Stimulant DJ's remix)
 "Shooting Star" (Pascal remix)
 "Shooting Star" (video)

UK CD2
 "Shooting Star" (Flip & Fill original mix)
 "Shooting Star" (CJ Stone remix)
 "True Love Never Dies"

UK 12-inch single
A1. "Shooting Star" (Flip & Fill original mix)
A2. "True Love Never Dies" (acapella)
B1. "Shooting Star" (CJ Stone remix)

Credits and personnel
Credits are lifted from the UK CD1 liner notes.

Studio
 Recorded at The Hutch Studio (UK)

Personnel
 Nick Arnold – writing
 Karen Parry – vocals
 Sue Quin – backing vocals
 Flip & Fill – production
 Lee Monteverde – engineering

Charts

Certifications

References

1997 songs
1998 singles
2002 singles
All Around the World Productions singles
Flip & Fill songs
Happy hardcore songs
House music songs